The men's 800 metres event at the 2008 World Junior Championships in Athletics was held in Bydgoszcz, Poland, at Zawisza Stadium on 8, 9 and 11 July.

Medalists

Results

Final
11 July

Semifinals
9 July

Semifinal 1

Semifinal 2

Semifinal 3

Heats
8 July

Heat 1

Heat 2

Heat 3

Heat 4

Heat 5

Heat 6

Participation
According to an unofficial count, 48 athletes from 35 countries participated in the event.

References

800 metres
800 metres at the World Athletics U20 Championships